

Hugh W. Weir (1826 – February 8, 1893) was a chief justice of the Idaho Territorial Court from 1888 to 1889. The court preceded the Idaho Supreme Court, established when Idaho became a state in 1890.

Early life and family
Weir was born in 1826 in Indiana, Pennsylvania, and he attended Blairsville Academy. He read law with Agustus Drum, and in 1852 he was admitted to practice law in Pennsylvania.

In 1849 Weir married Katherine A. Porter, and the marriage produced three children, Agnes Lenore (Baker), Edward Weir, and Hugh Weir.

Career
Soon Weir and Drum formed a law partnership in Indiana, Weir later partnering with Robert M. Gibson in Pittsburgh in 1870 then with J.M. Garrison in 1884. A Democrat, Weir was active in local politics, and he ran unsuccessfully for Congress against John Covode in 1866.

President Cleveland nominated Weir to replace James B. Hays, Chief Justice of the Idaho Territorial Court, in 1888, and the nomination was confirmed by the United States Senate later that year. Weir had been nominated as Chief Justice of the Supreme Court of Utah Territory, but that appointment went to Elliott Sandford.

In 1889 Judge Weir wrote an opinion upholding the Idaho Territorial Legislature in its partition of Alturas County. Weir's political opponents, led by W.R. Riley of Hailey, the county seat, demanded that Weir be removed from office. President Harrison replaced Weir with James H. Beatty, a judge from Hailey, in November, 1889.

Death
After his time as chief justice, Weir formed a partnership with J.R. Wester, Weir & Wester, and he continued his law practice in Boise until his death in 1893.

See also
 List of justices of the Idaho Supreme Court

References

1826 births
1893 deaths
19th-century American judges
19th-century American lawyers
Justices of the Idaho Supreme Court